Keystone or key-stone or variation, may refer to:
 Keystone (architecture), a central stone or other piece at the apex of an arch or vault
 Keystone (cask), a fitting used in ale casks

Business
 Keystone Law, a full-service law firm
 Digital Keystone, a developer of digital entertainment software
 Keystone Aircraft Corporation
 Keystone Bridge Company, an American bridge building company
 Keystone (beer brand)
 Keystone Camera Company
 Keystone (gasoline automobile)
 Keystone (steam automobile)
 Keystone Pipeline, a crude oil pipeline
 Keystone-SDA/Keystone-ATS, a Swiss press agency
 Keystone View Company, a US photo agency
 Keystone (Berkeley, California), a defunct music club

Entertainment
 Keystone (video game), part of the Xbox Live Arcade title Fable 2 Pub Games
 Keystone (band), led by jazz trumpeter Dave Douglas
 Keystone (album), a 2005 album by the band
 Keystone Cops, a silent movie series
 Keystone Kapers, a classic Atari game
 Keystone Studios, a movie studio

Places
 The Keystone asterism in the Hercules constellation

United States
 The "Keystone State", nickname for the U.S. Commonwealth of Pennsylvania
 Keystone, Colorado, a town
 Keystone Resort, the related ski resort
 Keystone, Florida, an unincorporated community
 Keystone, Indiana
 Keystone, Iowa
 Keystone, Nebraska
 Keystone, North Dakota
 Keystone, Ohio
 Keystone, South Dakota, a town near Mount Rushmore
 Keystone, Wyoming
 Keystone at the Crossing, a business/shopping district in Indianapolis, Indiana
 The Fashion Mall at Keystone, located in the Keystone shopping district
 Keystone Heights, Florida
 Keystone Canyon, Alaska
 Keystone Lake, a resort area near Tulsa, Oklahoma
 Keystone, Wisconsin

Canada
 The "Keystone Province", a nickname for the Province of Manitoba
 Keystone Centre, an arena and exhibition centre in Brandon, Manitoba

Fictional locations
 Keystone City, home of the comic book character The Flash
 Keystone City, a holographic city in the Star Trek: The Next Generation episode "Emergence"

Railroads
 Keystone Corridor, a rail corridor from Philadelphia to Pittsburgh
 Keystone Service, a current New York-Harrisburg service
Keystone (Amtrak train, 1979-1981), a predecessor of the current service
 Keystone (Amtrak train, 1971-1972), a former New York-Pittsburgh service operated by Amtrak
 Keystone, a former New York-Washington service operated by the Pennsylvania Railroad
 Keystone (train), a lightweight train used for the service

Schools
 Keystone School, a private K-12 school in San Antonio, Texas, USA
 Keystone National High School, a private correspondence school
 Keystone Exam, a Pennsylvania standardized test

Sports
 Keystone Junior Hockey League, in Manitoba
 Keystone Cup, Western Canadian Junior "B" ice hockey championship
 Keystone (horse), a racehorse

Other uses
 Keystone (limestone), quarried in the Florida Keys
 Keystone effect, caused by projecting an image onto a surface at an angle, or by photography at an angle
 Keystone Initiative, a medical protocol to reduce infection rates
 Keystone module, a type of data connector mounted in walls and patch panels
 Keystone Press Awards
 Keystone species, species that have a larger effect on their environment than is purely due to their abundance
 Operation Keystone, during World War II
 Keystone, a variety of screwdriver blade
 "Keystone", a descriptive reference to the Book of Mormon
The Keystone, journal of the Pennsylvania Railroad Technical and Historical Society
The Keystone, Pennsylvania news website owned by Courier Newsroom

See also

 Stone (disambiguation)
 Key (disambiguation)
 The Stone Key (2008 novel) post-apocalyptic novel by Isobelle Carmody
 Stone Key Partners (bank) U.S. boutique investment bank